Depressaria venustella is a moth of the family Depressariidae. It is found on Sicily.

References

Moths described in 1990
Depressaria
Endemic fauna of Italy
Moths of Europe